Segunda Mano (English: Second Hand) is a 2011 Filipino supernatural science fiction horror film directed by Joyce Bernal, and it stars Kris Aquino, Dingdong Dantes, and Angelica Panganiban. The film was produced and released by Star Cinema with the co-production of AgostoDos Pictures, and MJM Productions. It is also an official entry to the 2011 Metro Manila Film Festival.

Plot
Owen (Rico Blanco) and Mariella (Angelica Panganiban) fight in a car by a lake. Owen has left his wife to be with Mariella, and is angry that Mariella is not willing to make the same sacrifice. The fight turns violent and Mariella tries to escape from the car. The scene cuts to flashback.

Mariella tells her husband, Ivan (Dingdong Dantes), that her best friend, Samantha (Bettina Carlos) needs company and drives off. Later, it is revealed that Mariella is dead.

Mabel (Kris Aquino) owns an antique store. She is the only child of her mother, Adela (Helen Gamboa). It is revealed that Mabel's sister, Marie, was lost in an accident when they were children. Marie's ghost haunts their home on the anniversary of her loss. One rainy day, Ivan meets Mabel and they begin a relationship. One year later, Ivan proposes. His daughter with Mariella, Angel, greets Mabel icily. Meanwhile, Samantha begins expressing her interest in Ivan, who does not reciprocate her feelings.

Mariella's ghost begins haunting Mabel. Upon advice from Mabel's best friend, Anna (Bangs Garcia), Mabel unknowingly buys Mariella's red bag but throws it out when she realizes. Anna's boyfriend, Dindo (Jhong Hilario), sees Mariella's ghost.

Samantha apparently jumps out her window after seeing Mariella's ghost. Ivan and Mabel argue after Mabel tells him she has been seeing Mariella's ghost. Angel and Mabel finally reconcile. Mabel and Anna turn to a medium, Manang Letty, for advice. At a séance, Mabel is told Mariella's soul has been released and the only way to set her free is to leave the red bag in church. However, an old lady sleeping inside the church takes the bag and leaves; the bag starts bleeding. Dindo sees Mariella's ghost again, and is killed. Mabel confronts Ivan, who thinks Mabel is leaving him for Dindo. Ivan turns violent, and Mabel ends the relationship.

Mabel takes Mariella's car to show Ivan as proof of the haunting. Mariella takes control and takes Mabel to the lake, revealing that it is Ivan who assaulted her at the beginning of the film, not Owen. Ivan then killed Mariella and ran the car, with Mariella in it, into the bottom of the lake.

Ivan calls and tells Mabel that Adela is with him. Mabel goes to save her mother. It is revealed that Ivan killed Owen, Mariella, Dindo, and Samantha. Mariella's ghost appeared to Dindo and Samantha just before Ivan was to kill them. Mabel and Ivan fight but Ivan overpowers her and throws her limp body into the pool. As Adela lies injured, Marie appears to Adela, and morphs into Mariella. On the home CCTV, Ivan notices Mariella bringing Mabel to safety, and Mabel knocks Ivan into the pool. Mariella grabs Ivan to drown him.

The epilogue shows the remains of the car that are found by the river, and Adela expresses relief at learning that Marie had led a good life and that her soul is at peace. Later, Ivan's ghost begins to haunt Mabel.

Cast

Main cast
 Kris Aquino as Mabel Domingo / Mariella (Possessed)
 Dingdong Dantes as Ivan Martinez
 Angelica Panganiban as Mariella "Marie" Domingo-Martinez

Supporting cast
 Helen Gamboa as Adela Domingo
 Bangs Garcia as Anna
 Jhong Hilario as Dindo
 Sofia Mallari as Angel
 Bettina Carlos as Samantha
 Rico Blanco as Owen
 Mosang as Manang Letty

Guest cast
 Ian Veneracion as Ivan's Father
 Erika Padilla as Ivan's Stepmother
 Angel Jacob as Young Adela
 Noel Colet as Ramon
 Sharlene San Pedro as young Mabel
 John Manalo as young Ivan

Release

Reception
Segunda Mano is in line of Kris Aquino's box-office hits under the horror genre, following her previous film co-starring Diether Ocampo under Star Cinema entitled Dalaw. The film has been graded with an "A" by the Cinema Evaluation Board of the Philippines.

Awards

See also
List of ghost films

References

External links

Segunda Mano Official Website
Movie Adventures: Segunda Mano - A Review

2011 films
Mosang films
2010s Tagalog-language films
Dingdong Dantes films
Philippine supernatural horror films
Philippine psychological thriller films
Philippine ghost films
Star Cinema films
AgostoDos Pictures films
Tagalog-language films
Films directed by Joyce Bernal